Thorshavet was a Norwegian whaling factory ship built in 1947 off the coast of Mauritania. It was later named Astra.

It collided with the cargo ship Karonga (Singapore) off the coast of Portuguese Guinea. It sank on 17 April 1974 with the loss of a crew member.

References 

Factory ships
1947 in Norway
Sandefjord
1947 ships
Whaling ships
Ships built in Norway
Maritime incidents in 1974